Samuel Nathaniel Cooke Jr. (26 June 1882 – 11 April 1964) was an English architect active in Birmingham, England in the early to mid 20th century. He was almost invariably credited as S. N. Cooke and his later work was carried out under the auspices of his firm S. N. Cooke and Partners. Works by him and the partnership include significant civic buildings, hospitals, and commercial premises in Birmingham and elsewhere in the United Kingdom.

Early career 

Cooke was born in Birmingham, England, in 1883.

His early works include the original Birmingham Repertory Theatre (1913), for director Barry Jackson. This was the first purpose-built repertory theatre in the UK. Jackson and Cooke took inspiration from the democratic nature of theatres they had visited in Germany. The design of The Repertory Theatre was particularly influenced by Max Littmann's 1908  in Munich. The Birmingham theatre is still in use, now known as the Old Rep.

Cooke also designed the city's civic war memorial, the Hall of Memory (1922–1925), in collaboration with W. Norman Twist. The designs included a Doric colonnade, which was moved to St. Thomas' Peace Garden in 1995, after the original site was redeveloped as Centenary Square.

During the 1920s and 1930s, he often worked collaboratively with the Birmingham sculptor, William Bloye, for example on the Hall of Memory and at 7–8 Waterloo Street.

Cooke was also involved in plans for the aborted Civic Centre on Broad Street, Birmingham.

S. N. Cooke and Partners 

Later works were attributed to the firm of S. N. Cooke and Partners.

The first tower blocks to be constructed by Birmingham City Council were the four collectively known as the Duddeston Four, the 12-storey High, Queens, Home and South Towers, completed between 1954 and 1955 to a design by S. N. Cooke and Partners.

The partnership was also responsible for significant projects for the National Health Service. These included the design of extensions to Selly Oak Hospital in 1963, with at least some of the work being done by Locksley Hare, a senior partner The hospital closed in 2012 and demolition is planned. Birmingham Dental Hospital was designed by Edward Allen of S. N. Cooke and Partners, in 1965. 

Architectural historian Andy Foster has said:

He died in Bromsgrove, Worcestershire, in 1964.

Works 

Buildings by S. N. Cooke, or S. N. Cooke and Partners, include:

References 

20th-century English architects
1883 births
1964 deaths
Architects from Birmingham, West Midlands